This is a list of newspapers in Dominica.

 The Chronicle
 Dominica News Online

See also
List of newspapers

References

External links

Dominica
Newspapers